The 3 to 10 ton was a sailing event on the Sailing at the 1900 Summer Olympics program in Meulan. Eleven boats started during the two races in the 3 to 10 ton. Twenty sailors are documented, besides the France and Great Britain participants there was a Mixed country team from the US and Great Britain. The races were held on 24 and 25 May 1900 on the river Seine.

Race schedule

Course area and course configuration 
For the 3 to 10 ton the  course in the Meulan course area was used.

Weather conditions 
The race was troublesome due to an almost complete absence of any wind. Also the fact that the wind there was came perpendicular to the course (river Seine) and was blocked or diverted by trees and buildings.

Final results 
Two separate races were sailed. No combined results were made.

Race of 24 May 1900

Race of 25 May 1900

Notes 
Mixed country teams during the 1900 Olympics are grouped together under the ZZX IOC code.

Other information 
Initially only the race on 24 May 1900 was part of the Olympic program. However the race on the 25 May 1900, initially part of the Exposition Universelle program, was afterwards awarded with an Olympic status.

Further reading

References 

3 to 10 ton
Ton class